Maurice 'Moss' O'Brien (born in Ireland) is a retired boxer who represented England.

Boxing career
O'Brien was the National Champion in 1978 after winning the prestigious ABA featherweight title, the title success was controversial because his opponent Austin Owens was considered by many to have done enough to have won the fight.

He represented England and won a bronze medal in the -57 kg featherweight division, at the 1978 Commonwealth Games in Edmonton, Alberta, Canada and boxed out of West Ham and later Repton (Bethnal Green) ABC.

References

Living people
British male boxers
Boxers at the 1978 Commonwealth Games
Commonwealth Games medallists in boxing
Commonwealth Games bronze medallists for England
Year of birth missing (living people)
Featherweight boxers
Medallists at the 1978 Commonwealth Games